Shady Grove is an unincorporated community in Franklin County, Tennessee, United States.

References

Unincorporated communities in Franklin County, Tennessee
Unincorporated communities in Tennessee